The Bahamas Association of Athletic Associations (BAAA) is the governing body for the sport of athletics in the Bahamas.  Current president is Rosamunde Carey.  She was elected on 28 November 2015 for the period 2015-2018. She becomes the first woman elected to the position

History 
Prior to 1952, there was already a Bahamas Athletic Association.  BAAA was founded on 6 May 1952 as Bahamas Amateur Athletic Association and was affiliated to the IAAF the same year.  First president was Alfred Frances Adderley.  Early in the new millennium the federation’s name was changed to The Bahamas Association of Athletic Associations.  A detailed report on the history of BAAA was given on Facebook.

Affiliations 
BAAA is the national member federation for the Bahamas in the following international organisations:
World Athletics
North American, Central American and Caribbean Athletic Association (NACAC)
Association of Panamerican Athletics (APA)
Central American and Caribbean Athletic Confederation (CACAC)
Moreover, it is part of the following national organisations:
Bahamas Olympic Committee (BOC)

National records 
BAAA maintains the Bahamian records in athletics.

References

External links 
Official Webpage 

Bahamas
Sports governing bodies in the Bahamas
Athletics in the Bahamas
1952 establishments in the Bahamas
Sports organizations established in 1952
National governing bodies for athletics